Felice Lenardon (born 19 July 1967) is a former Italian paralympic athlete who won five medals at the Summer Paralympics.

References

External links
 

Living people
1967 births
Place of birth missing (living people)
Paralympic athletes of Italy
Paralympic gold medalists for Italy
Paralympic silver medalists for Italy
Paralympic bronze medalists for Italy
Medalists at the 1960 Summer Paralympics
Athletes (track and field) at the 1960 Summer Paralympics
Paralympic medalists in athletics (track and field)
Italian male javelin throwers
Italian male shot putters
21st-century Italian people
20th-century Italian people
Paralympic javelin throwers
Paralympic shot putters